The Battle of Gallipoli occurred on 29 May 1416 between a squadron of the Venetian navy and the fleet of the Ottoman Empire off the Ottoman naval base of Gallipoli. The battle was the main episode of a brief conflict between the two powers, resulting from Ottoman attacks against Venetian possessions and shipping in the Aegean Sea in late 1415. The Venetian fleet, under Pietro Loredan, was charged with transporting Venetian envoys to the Sultan, but was authorized to attack if the Ottomans refused to negotiate. The subsequent events are known chiefly from a letter written by Loredan after the battle. The Ottomans exchanged fire with the Venetian ships as soon as the Venetian fleet approached Gallipoli, forcing the Venetians to withdraw.

On the next day, the two fleets manoeuvred and fought off Gallipoli, but during the evening, Loredan managed to contact the Ottoman authorities and inform them of his diplomatic mission. Despite assurances that the Ottomans would welcome the envoys, when the Venetian fleet approached the city on the next day, the Ottoman fleet sailed to meet the Venetians and the two sides quickly became embroiled in battle. The Venetians scored a crushing victory, killing the Ottoman admiral, capturing a large part of the Ottoman fleet, and taking large numbers prisoner, of whom many—particularly the Christians serving voluntarily in the Ottoman fleet—were executed. The Venetians then retired to Tenedos to replenish their supplies and rest. Although a crushing Venetian victory, which confirmed Venetian naval superiority in the Aegean Sea for the next few decades, the settlement of the conflict was delayed until a peace treaty was signed in 1419.

Background

In 1413, the Ottoman prince Mehmed I ended the civil war of the Ottoman Interregnum and established himself as Sultan and the sole master of the Ottoman realm. The Republic of Venice, as the premier maritime and commercial power in the area, endeavoured to renew the treaties it had concluded with Mehmed's predecessors during the civil war, and in May 1414, its bailo in the Byzantine capital, Constantinople, Francesco Foscarini, was instructed to proceed to the Sultan's court to that effect. Foscarini failed, however, as Mehmed campaigned in Anatolia, and Venetian envoys were traditionally instructed not to move too far from the shore (and the Republic's reach); Foscarini had yet to meet the Sultan by July 1415, when Mehmed's displeasure at this delay was conveyed to the Venetian authorities. In the meantime, tensions between the two powers mounted, as the Ottomans moved to re-establish a sizeable navy and launched several raids that challenged Venetian naval hegemony in the Aegean Sea.

During his 1414 campaign in Anatolia, Mehmed came to Smyrna, where several of the most important Latin rulers of the Aegean—the Genoese lords of Chios, Phokaia, and Lesbos, and even the Grand Master of the Knights Hospitaller—came to do him obeisance. According to the contemporary Byzantine historian Doukas (after 1462), the absence of the Duke of Naxos from this assembly provoked the ire of the Sultan, who in retaliation equipped a fleet of 30 vessels, under the command of Çali Bey, and in late 1415 sent it to raid the Duke's domains in the Cyclades. The Ottoman fleet ravaged the islands, and carried off a large part of the inhabitants of Andros, Paros, and Melos. On the other hand, the Venetian historian Marino Sanuto the Younger (1466–1536) indicates that the Ottoman attack was in retaliation for the raids against Ottoman shipping undertaken by Pietro Zeno, the lord of Andros. Like the Duke of Naxos, Zeno was a Venetian citizen and vassal of the Republic of Venice, but he had not been included in the previous treaties between the Republic and the Ottomans, and had continued raiding Ottoman shipping on his own account.

In June 1414, Ottoman ships raided the Venetian colony of Euboea and pillaged its capital, Negroponte, taking almost all its inhabitants prisoner; out of some 2,000 captives, the Republic was able after years to secure the release of 200 mostly elderly, women, and children, the rest being sold as slaves. Furthermore, in the autumn of 1415, ostensibly in retaliation for Zeno's attacks, an Ottoman fleet of 42 ships—six galleys, 26 galleots, and the rest smaller brigantines—tried to intercept a Venetian merchant convoy coming from the Black Sea at the island of Tenedos, at the southern entrance of the Dardanelles. The Venetian vessels were delayed at Constantinople by bad weather, but managed to pass through the Ottoman fleet and outrun its pursuit to the safety of Negroponte. The Ottoman fleet instead raided Euboea, including an attack on the fortress of Oreos (Loreo) in northern Euboea, but its defenders under the castellan Taddeo Zane resisted with success. Nevertheless, the Turks were able to once again ravage the rest of the island, carrying off 1,500 captives, so that the local inhabitants even petitioned the Signoria of Venice for permission to become tributaries of the Turks to guarantee their future safety—a demand categorically rejected by the Signoria on 4 February 1416. The raids spread considerable panic: Lepanto was deserted, and at Venice no one was found who wanted to contract, not even for a small sum, the right to equip merchant galleys of Tana, Constantinople, and Trebizond, which ordinarily fetched prices up to 2,000 ducats, forcing the Venetian government to supply armed escorts at its own expense. Nevertheless, the same missives to Venice also highlighted the bad state of the Turkish fleet, especially of its crews; and expressed the certainty that if a Venetian fleet had been present to confront them, it would have been victorious.

In response to the Ottoman raids, the Great Council of Venice engaged in feverish military preparations. A half-percent levy was raised on goods, soldiers and crossbowmen were recruited, and the experienced Pietro Loredan was appointed Captain of the Gulf, at the head of a fleet of fifteen galleys; five were to be equipped in Venice, four at Candia, and one each at Negroponte, Napoli di Romania (Nauplia), Andros, and Corfu. Loredan's brother Giorgio, Jacopo Barbarigo, Cristoforo Dandolo, and Pietro Contarini were appointed as galley captains (sopracomiti), while Andrea Foscolo and Delfino Venier were designated as provveditori of the fleet and envoys to the Sultan. While Foscolo was charged with a mission to the Principality of Achaea, Venier was tasked with reaching a new agreement with the Sultan on the basis of the treaty concluded between Musa Çelebi and the Venetian envoy Giacomo Trevisan in 1411, and with securing the release of the Venetian prisoners taken in 1414. Should negotiations fail, he was empowered to seek to form an anti-Ottoman league with the Bey of Karaman, the Prince of Wallachia, and the rebellious Ottoman prince Mustafa Çelebi. Loredan's appointment was unusual, as he had served recently as Captain of the Gulf, and law forbade anyone who had held the position from holding the same for three years after; however, the Great Council overrode this rule due to the de facto state of war with the Ottomans. In a further move calculated to bolster Loredan's authority (and appeal to his vanity), an old rule that had fallen into disuse was revived, whereby only the captain-general had the right to carry the Banner of Saint Mark on his flagship, rather than every sopracomito. With "rare unanimity", the Great Council voted to authorize Loredan to attack Ottoman possessions if the Ottomans had continued their raids in the meantime. If they were unwilling to negotiate a cessation of hostilities, he was to protect Venetian shipping and attack the Ottomans, without however putting his ships in excessive danger. Nevertheless, the emphasis of the Council's instructions was to ensure peace, and Loredan's squadron was intended as a form of military pressure to expedite negotiations; as no further news of Ottoman attacks arrived until Loredan sailed in April, the expectation in the Venetian government was that the matter would likely be resolved peacefully.

The main target of Loredan's fleet was to be Gallipoli. The city was the "key of the Dardanelles" and one of the most important strategic positions in the Eastern Mediterranean. At the time it was also the main Turkish naval base and provided a safe haven for their corsairs raiding Venetian colonies in the Aegean. With Constantinople still in Christian hands, Gallipoli had also for decades been the main crossing point for the Ottoman armies from Anatolia to Europe. As a result of its strategic importance, Sultan Bayezid I took care to improve its fortifications, rebuilding the citadel and strengthening the harbour defences. The harbour had a seaward wall and a narrow entrance leading to an outer basin, separated from an inner basin by a bridge, where Bayezid erected a three-storey tower (the "Birghoz-i Gelibolu", after the Greek word for "tower"). When Ruy González de Clavijo visited the city in 1403, he reported seeing its citadel full of troops, a large arsenal, and 40 ships in the harbour.

Bayezid aimed to use his warships in Gallipoli to control (and tax) the passage of shipping through the Dardanelles, an ambition which brought him into direct conflict with Venetian interests in the area. While the Ottoman fleet was not yet strong enough to face the Venetians, it forced the latter to provide armed escort to their trade convoys passing through the Dardanelles. Securing right of unimpeded passage through the Dardanelles was a chief issue in Venice's diplomatic relations with the Ottomans: the Republic had secured this in the 1411 treaty with Musa Çelebi, but the failure to renew that agreement in 1414 had again rendered Gallipoli, in the words of the Ottomanist Halil İnalcık, "the main object of dispute in Venetian-Ottoman relations", and the Ottoman naval activity in 1415, based in Gallipoli, further underscored its importance.

Battle
The events before and during the battle are described in detail in a letter sent by Loredan to the Signoria on 2 June 1416, which was included by the 16th-century Venetian historian Marin Sanudo in his (posthumously published) History of the Doges of Venice, albeit with some major omissions, which are filled by the Morosini Codex of Antonio Morisini, who copies the letter virtually verbatim. This account is essentially corroborated by the 15th-century Venetian historian Zancaruolo, who provides some additional details from the now vanished Venetian archives or oral traditions, while Doukas also provides a brief and somewhat divergent account, which evidently is drawn from rumours and hearsay. The contemporary Byzantine historian, Sphrantzes and Laonikos Chalkokondyles also provide brief accounts, emphasizing the Venetians' reluctance to get drawn into battle.

According to Loredan's letter, his fleet—four galleys from Venice, four from Candia, and one each from Negroponte and Napoli di Romania—was delayed by contrary winds and reached Tenedos on 24 May, and did not enter the Dardanelles until the 27th, when they arrived near Gallipoli. Loredan reports that the Venetians took care to avoid projecting any hostile intentions, avoiding any preparations for battle, such as erecting a pavisade around the ships. The Ottomans, who had assembled a large force of infantry and 200 cavalry on the shore, began firing on them with arrows. Loredan dispersed his ships to avoid casualties, but the tide was drawing them closer to the shore. Loredan tried to signal the Ottomans that they had no hostile intentions, but the latter kept firing poisoned arrows at them, until Loredan ordered a few cannon shots that killed a few soldiers and forced the rest to retire from the shore towards the anchorage of their fleet.

At dawn on the next day (28 May), Loredan sent two galleys, bearing the Banner of Saint Mark, to the entry of the port of Gallipoli to open negotiations. In response the Turks sent 32 ships to attack them. Loredan withdrew his two galleys, and began to withdraw, while shooting at the Turkish ships, in order to lure them away from Gallipoli. As the Ottoman ships could not keep up with their oars, they set sail as well; on the Venetian side, the galley from Napoli di Romania tarried during the manoeuvre and was in danger of being caught by the pursuing Ottoman ships, so that Loredan likewise ordered his ships to set sail. Once they were made ready for combat, Loredan ordered his ten galleys to lower sails, turn about, and face the Ottoman fleet. At that point, however, the eastern wind rose suddenly, and the Ottomans decided to break off the pursuit and head back to Gallipoli. Loredan in turn tried to catch up with the Ottomans, firing at them with his guns and crossbows and launching grappling hooks at the Turkish ships, but the wind and the current allowed the Ottomans to retreat speedily behind the fortifications of Gallipoli, where they went to anchor in battle formation, with their prows to the open sea. According to Loredan, the engagement lasted until the 22nd hour.

Loredan then sent a messenger to the Ottoman fleet commander to complain about the attack, insisting that his intentions were pacific, and that his sole purpose was to convey the two ambassadors to the Sultan. The Ottoman commander replied that he was ignorant of that fact, and that the fleet was meant to sail to the Danube and stop Mehmed's brother and rival for the throne, Mustafa Çelebi, from crossing from Wallachia into Ottoman Rumelia. The Ottoman commander informed Loredan that he and his crews could land and provision themselves without fear, and that the members of the embassy would be conveyed with the appropriate honours and safety to their destination. Loredan sent a notary, Thomas, with an interpreter to the Ottoman commander and the captain of the garrison of Gallipoli to express his regrets, but also to gauge the number, equipment, and dispositions of the Ottoman galleys. The Ottoman dignitaries reassured Thomas of their good will, and proposed to provide an armed escort for the ambassadors to bring them to the court of Sultan Mehmed.

After the envoy returned, the Venetian fleet, sailing with difficulty against the eastern wind, departed and sailed to a nearby bay to spend the night. During the night, a council of war took placed, which is omitted by Sanudo but provided by Morosini. The provveditore Venier and the Candiot sopracomito Albano Capello urged to seize the opportunity to attack, since the Ottoman fleet was disorganized, and its crews largely composed of Christian slaves, who were likely to use the opportunity to escape. Loredan and the other sopracomiti hesitated to go against their instructions, or to attack the enemy fleet, protected as it was by a powerful fortress and close to reinforcements. During the same night, the Turkish ships left their anchorage and deployed in a line of battle opposite the Venetians, without however making any hostile moves; but at and around Gallipoli, numerous troop movements could be observed, with soldiers boarding vessels of every kind. As the naval historian Camillo Manfroni comments, this "was perhaps a measure of precaution and surveillance, so that with the favour of the night the Venetians would not ferry Mustafa's militias; but at the same time it was a provocation". Loredan managed to move his ships about half a mile away from the Turks; but he also modified his orders to his fleet, commanding them to be ready for combat at any moment.

On the next day, in accordance to the messages exchanged the previous day, Loredan led his ships towards Gallipoli to replenish his supplies of water, while leaving three galleys—those of his brother, of Dandolo, and of Capello of Candia—as a reserve in his rear. As soon as the Venetians approached the town, the Ottoman fleet sailed to meet them, and one of their galleys approached and fired a few cannon shots at the Venetian vessels. According to the account by Doukas, the Venetians were pursuing a merchant vessel of Lesbos thought to be of Turkish origin, coming from Constantinople. The Ottomans likewise thought that the merchant vessel was one of their own, and one of their galleys moved to defend the vessel, bringing the two fleets into battle.

The galley from Napoli, which sailed to his left, was again showing signs of disorder, so Loredan ordered it moved to the right, away from the approaching Turks. Loredan had his ships withdraw a while, in order to draw the Turks further from Gallipoli and have the sun to the Venetians' back. Both Zancaruolo and Chalkokondyles report that the Napoli galley opened the battle by advancing ahead of the Venetian fleet—its captain, Girolamo Minotto, misinterpreted Loredan's signals to stay back, according to Chalkokondyles—and attacking the Ottoman flagship, after which Loredan with the rest of the Venetian fleet joined the battle. Loredan himself describes his own ship's attack on the leading Ottoman galley. Its crew offered determined resistance, and the other Ottoman galleys came astern of Loredan's ship to his left, and launched volleys of arrows against him and his men. Loredan himself was wounded by an arrow below the eye and the nose, and by another that passed through his left hand, as well as other arrows that struck him with lesser effect. Nevertheless, the galley was captured after most of its crew was killed, and Loredan, after leaving a few men of his crew to guard it, turned against a galleot, which he captured as well. Again leaving a few of his men and his flag on it, he turned on the other Ottoman ships. The fight lasted from dawn to the second hour. Both Venetian and Byzantine sources agree that many of the Ottoman crews simply jumped into the sea and abandoned their ships, and that the Ottomans retreated once the battle clearly turned against them.

The Venetians defeated the Ottoman fleet, killing its commander Çali Bey ("Cialasi-beg Zeberth") and many of the captains and crews, and capturing six great galleys and nine galleots, according to Loredan's account. Doukas claims that the Venetians captured 27 vessels in total, while the contemporary Egyptian chronicler Maqrizi reduced the number to twelve. Loredan gives a detailed breakdown of the ships captured by his men: his own ship captured a galley and a galleot of 20 banks of oars; the Contarini galley captured a galley; the galley of Giorgio Loredan captured two galleots of 22 banks and two galleots of 20 banks; the Grimani galley of Negroponte captured a galley; the galley of Jiacopo Barbarini captured a galleot of 23 banks and another of 19 banks; the same for the Capello galley; the galley of Girolamo Minotto from Napoli captured the Ottoman flagship galley, which had been defeated and pursued before by the Capello galley; the Venieri and Barbarigo galleys of Candia took a galley. Venetian casualties were light, twelve killed—mostly by drowning—and 340 wounded, most of them lightly. Loredan reported taking 1,100 captives, while Maqrizi puts the total number of Ottoman dead at 4,000 men. 

The Venetian fleet then approached Gallipoli and bombarded the port, without response from the Ottomans within the walls. The Venetians then retired about a mile from Gallipoli to recover their strength and tend to their wounded. Among the captive Ottoman crews were found to be many Christians—Genoese, Catalans, Cretans, Provencals, and Sicilians—who were all executed by hanging from the yardarms, while a certain Giorgio Calergi, who had participated in a revolt against Venice, was quartered at the deck of Loredan's flagship. Many of the Christian galley slaves also perished in combat. Doukas places these events later, at Tenedos, where the Turkish prisoners were executed, while the Christian prisoners were divided into those who had been pressed into service as galley slaves, who were liberated, and those who had entered Ottoman service as mercenaries, who were impaled. After burning five galleots in sight of Gallipoli, Loredan made ready to retire with his ships to Tenedos to take on water, repair his ships, tend to his wounded, and make new plans. The Venetian commander sent a new letter to the Ottoman commander in the city complaining of breach of faith and explaining that he would return from Tenedos to carry out his mission of escorting the ambassadors, but the Ottoman commander did not reply.

Aftermath
One of the Turkish captains that had been taken prisoner also composed a letter to the Sultan, stating that the Venetians had been attacked without cause. He also informed Loredan that the remnants of the Ottoman fleet were such that they posed no threat to him: a single galley and a few galleots and smaller vessels were seaworthy, while the rest of the galleys in Gallipoli were out of commission. At Tenedos, Loredan held a council of war, where the opinion was to return to Negroponte for provisions, for offloading the wounded, and for selling three of the galleys for prize money for the crews. Loredan disagreed, believing that they should keep up the pressure on the Turks, and resolved to return to Gallipoli to press for the passage of the ambassadors to the Sultan's court. He sent his brother with his ship to bring the more heavily wounded to Negroponte, and burned three of the captured galleys since they were too much of a burden—in his letter to the Signoria, he expressed the hope that his men would still be recompensed for them, his shipwrights estimating their value at 600 gold ducats.

Between 24 and 26 July, Dolfino Venier managed to reach a first agreement with the Sultan, including the mutual return of prisoners. However, the latter term exceeded his original brief and was ill-received in Venice, since the Ottoman naval prisoners were valuable as potential galley slaves and their release would strengthen the Ottoman fleet. Consequently, on his return to Venice on 31 October, Venier found himself under trial; he was eventually acquitted. On 24 February 1417, an envoy of the Sultan, a "gran baron" named "Chamitzi" (probably Hamza) arrived in Venice, and demanded the release of the Ottoman prisoners, especially since the Sultan had already released 200 of the prisoners taken at Negroponte. To this the Venetians, who regarded Venier's agreement as void, objected that only the old and infirm were released, while the rest had been sold to slavery; and that no comparison could be made between people captured during a raid with prisoners taken "in a just war".

According to Doukas, in the same spring Loredan led his fleet into the Dardanelles once more, and attempted to capture a fortress that had been erected by Mehmed's brother, Süleyman Çelebi, at Lampsakos on the Anatolian side of the Straits (the so-called "Emir Süleyman Burkozi"). While they inflicted significant damage to the fort with their missiles, the Venetians were prevented from landing due to the presence of Hamza Bey, the brother of the Grand Vizier Bayezid Pasha, with 10,000 men. As a result, the Venetians left the fort half-destroyed and sailed on to Constantinople, but in their wake, Hamza Bey had the fort razed, for fear that the Venetians might in the future capture it. In May 1417, the Venetians instructed their bailo in Constantinople, Giovanni Diedo, to seek a peace agreement with the Sultan, but during the next two years Diedo was unable to achieve anything, partly due to the restrictions placed on his movements—he was not to proceed more than four days' march inland from the shore—and partly due to the Sultan's own stance, which was expected to be negative to Venice's proposals. Freedom of passage for the Dardanelles, and an exemption from any duties or tolls for that passage, were among the chief Venetian demands.

The conflict was finally ended in November 1419, when a peace treaty was signed between the Sultan and the new Venetian bailo in Constantinople, Bertuccio Diedo, in which the Ottomans recognized by name Venice's overseas possessions, and agreed to an exchange of prisoners—those taken by the Ottomans from Euboea, and by Venice at Gallipoli.

The victory at Gallipoli ensured Venetian naval superiority for decades to come, but also led the Venetians to complacency and over-confidence, as, according to historian Seth Parry, the "seemingly effortless trouncing of the Ottoman fleet confirmed the Venetians in their beliefs that they were vastly superior to the Turks in naval warfare". During the long Siege of Thessalonica (1422–1430) and subsequent conflicts over the course of the century, however, "the Venetians would learn to their discomfiture that naval superiority alone could not guarantee an everlasting position of strength in the eastern Mediterranean".

Notes

References

Sources
 
 
 
 
 
 
 
 
 
 
 
 
 
 
 
 

1416 in Europe
1416 in the Ottoman Empire
15th century in the Republic of Venice
Conflicts in 1416
Gelibolu
Gallipoli 1416
Gallipoli 1416
Gallipoli 1416
History of the Dardanelles